Knajka is a stream in the Cieszyn County, Silesian Voivodeship, Poland, in the historical region of Cieszyn Silesia. It is a left tributary of the Vistula, which it enters just south of Strumień. It flows through Ogrodzona, Kostkowice, Dębowiec, Knaj and Bąków. Numerous fish ponds are located alongside of it.

The name of the river is derived from a word knieja denoting a wild, dense forest.

Notes

References 
 

Rivers of Poland
Rivers of Silesian Voivodeship
Cieszyn County
Cieszyn Silesia